Giuseppe Sorge (1857–1937) was an Italian historian, prefect and director of the public security. He was born in Sutera, Sicily.

Biography 
He came from a rich and distinguished family of Mussomeli. Son of Carmelo Sorce (1820–1896), administrator of the goods of Lanza Branciforte of Trabia, and of Maria Crocifissa Nola. In 1884 he married Maria Carolina Crima (1862–1917), nephew of Paolo Paternostro, Red Cross nurse who died during the First World War to fatal disease he contracted in the hospital in Brescia where he lavished.

He graduated in law at the College of San Rocco, Palermo. Admitted in service on May 12, 1880, in 1887 he was appointed Regio delegato straordinario of Bronte, during the epidemic of cholera. In 1892 appointed as regio delegato of Acireale and shortly after, he was appointed as sub-prefect of Termini Imerese (1893–94) and in that period, he was involved in the bloody repression of the Fasci Siciliani. He was later appointed Prefect of Girgenti (October 1, 1904 – April 15, 1907) and subsequently in Lecce (April 5, 1907 – October 1, 1909) where he founded a consortium for health supervision security in the province of Terra d'Otranto. In 1909 he was appointed Prefect of Brescia (October 1, 1909 – January 1, 1912) and Naples (January 1, 1912 – May 16, 1914) where he was appointed Prefect of first class (May 22, 1931). Relocated to Brescia (October 1, 1915 – September 1, 1917). Later assigned to Venice (September 1, 1917 – November 1, 1917) where it was placed at the disposal of the Ministry of Interior who appointed him Director General of Public Security (September 29, 1917 – March 10, 1919) under the Ministry Orlando. He ceased office on February 25, 1919.

He died in Palermo on February 13, 1937. He was buried in the cemetery of St. Ursula Palermo, next to his wife Maria Carolina Crima.

Recognitions 
He was promoted to Grand Officer of the Order of the Crown of Italy.

Bibliography

Books 
  "Mussomeli dall'origine all'abolizione della feudalità, 1910–1916" (Catania, Niccolò Giannotta Editore, 1916, reprinted by Edizioni Ristampe Siciliane, Palermo 1982.)
  "Il cantore di Rosa fresca: divagazioni d'un dilettante" (Palermo, Tipografia Michele Montaina, 1925)
  "I Teatri di Palermo nei secoli XVI-XVII-XVIII, Saggio Storico" (Palermo, Industrie Riunite Editoriali Siciliane, 1926, pp. 419, in-8, m.tela)
  "Mussomeli nel secolo XIX, Cronache dal 1812 al 1900" (Palermo, Tipografia Michele Montaina, 1931)

Letters and Speeches 
  "Relazione al Consiglio comunale di Bronte" (Palermo, Tipografia f.lli Puglisi, 1887) relation red on November 26, 1887 from regio delegato straordinario avv. Giuseppe Sorge.
  Letter to G.Lodi (October 4, 1904 –  Societa' Siciliana per la Storia Patria)
 "Sull'azione spiegata dal Ministero dell'Interno e dalle Prefetture per l'applicazione della Legge 19 giugno 1913 n. 632 contro l'alcoolismo" relation presented to the "Commissione di Statistica e Legislazione" at Ministry of Justice in April–May 1918 (Rome. Tipografia L. Cecchini, 1919)
  "Sulle dimostrazioni antiaustriache del 1914 – Lettera aperta a S.E. Antonio Calandra" (Palermo, Industrie Riunite Editoriali Siciliane, 1926)
  "Testimonianza resa al tribunale di Palermo da Giuseppe Sorge quale direttore generale di P.S. il 1º ottobre 1917 in relazione al magazzino dei generi requisiti a navi nemiche " (Archivio Storico della Camera dei deputati, Archivio della Camera Regia 1848–1943, Commissioni parliamentari d'inchiesta)
  Letter to Luigi Sturzo (November 7, 1918 – Archivio Beni di Stato)

References 

1937 deaths
20th-century Italian historians
Recipients of Italian civil awards and decorations
1857 births